Ballangen is a former municipality in Nordland county, Norway. The municipality existed from 1925 until its dissolution in 2020. The  municipality was part of the traditional district of Ofoten.  The administrative centre of the municipality was the village of Ballangen.  Other villages in the municipality included Bjørkåsen, Kjeldebotn, Kobbvika, and Skarstad.

The municipality bordered Narvik Municipality to the east and Tysfjord Municipality to the south, and had a short border with Sweden to the southeast. Ballangen was situated on the southern shore of Ofotfjorden. Ballangen also included the long and narrow Efjorden, just south of the much larger Ofotfjorden. Its immediate surroundings were dominated by fjords, mountains, and forests. Ballangen relied on the nearby town of Narvik as its economic base.

Prior to its dissolution, the  municipality was the 119th largest by area out of the 422 municipalities in Norway. Ballangen was the 290th most populous municipality in Norway with a population of 2,522.

General information

The municipality of Ballangen was established on 1 July 1925 when it was separated from the large Evenes Municipality.  The new municipality encompassed all of Evenes located south of the Ofotfjorden.  Initially, Ballangen had 3,270 residents.

During the 1960s, there were many municipal mergers across Norway due to the work of the Schei Committee. On 1 January 1962, the southern part of Lødingen Municipality (the island of Barøya and the area surrounding the Efjorden; population: 433) was transferred from Lødingen to Ballangen.

On 1 January 2020, the municipality was merged with the neighboring Narvik Municipality and the eastern half of Tysfjord Municipality to form a new, larger municipality of Narvik. This decision had been reached in 2017 after national and local discussions involving municipal mergers.

Coat of arms
The coat of arms was granted on 18 July 1980 and it was in use until 1 January 2020 when the municipality was dissolved. The official blazon is "Vert, a hammer Or in pale". This means the arms have a green field (background) and the charge is an upright hammer. The hammer has a tincture of Or which means it is commonly colored yellow, but if it is made out of metal, then gold is used. The green color in the field symbolizes the importance of agriculture and the hammer was chosen to represent mining in the municipality. There used to be copper mines in the municipality. The arms were designed by Hallvard Trætteberg.

Name
The municipality is named after the old Ballangen farm which is located at the head of a small fjord with the same name.

Churches
The Church of Norway had one parish within the municipality of Ballangen. It was part of the Ofoten prosti (deanery) in the Diocese of Sør-Hålogaland.

History
The first person living in Ballangen was Lodve Lange (Lodve the long), who is mentioned in Heimskringla as being one of King Olav Tryggvason's most trusted warriors, and being placed near the king in the famous ship Ormen Lange (long serpent). Lodve probably participated in the Battle of Svolder in the year 1000, and might have been killed there. He lived at Saltvik, which is near the fjord, east of today's village of Ballangen.

There is a long history of mining in Ballangen, starting from the 17th century. Over the years as many as 36 mines have been operated in Ballangen, including minerals like copper, nickel and iron, zinc, manganese, and lead, but the most serious mining started in 1911 with Bjørkåsen Gruver mining mostly pyrite.  Mining for nickel and olivine continued until 2002. There is also a dolomite quarry in Ballangen.  Ballangen is the main agricultural municipality in the Ofoten region. The Ballangen Museum is located in the village of Bjørkåsen in the municipality and presents the local mining history.

Ballangen has the dubious distinction of having Norway's highest rate of sick leave from work, probably due to the high number of people who worked in the mines there, and related environmental effects.

Government
During its existence, this municipality was governed by a municipal council of elected representatives, which in turn elected a mayor.

Municipal council
The municipal council of Ballangen was made up of 17 representatives that were elected to four year terms.  The party breakdown of the final municipal council was as follows:

Mayors
The mayors of Ballangen:

 1925-1929: John Magnus Østvik (Bp)
 1930-1931: Lorentz Andreas Benjaminsen (Bp)
 1932-1934: Gunnar Carlsen (V)
 1935-1938: Nils Rognli Grande (Ap)
 1939-1941: Harald Strømsnes (LL)
 1941-1942: John Magnus Østvik (Bp)
 1943-1945: Oskar Hole (NS)
 1945-1946: Harald Strømsnes (LL)
 1946-1947: Peder Andreas Eriksen (Ap)
 1948-1951: Kador Johansen (Ap)
 1952-1956: John Magnus Østvik (Bp)
 1956-1961: Leif Rødseth (Ap)
 1962-1963: Atle-Rolv Dahl (V)
 1964-1967: Agnar Bjørkseth (Ap)
 1967-1976: Ansgar Dahl (Ap)
 1976-1979: Bjarne Jakobsen (Ap)
 1979-1987: Kolbjørn Dahlin (Sp)
 1987-1991: Knut Knutsen (Ap)
 1991-1993: Asmund Dybvand (Sp)
 1993-1999: Ivar Skoglund (H)
 1999-1999: Per Kristian Arntzen (Sp)
 1999-2003: Einar Gabrielsen (H)
 2003-2007: Per Kristian Arntzen (Sp)
 2007-2015: Anne-Rita Nicklasson (H)
 2015-2020: Per Kristian Arntzen (Sp)

Geography

The village of Ballangen lies along the southern shore of the Ofotfjorden along the European route E6 highway.  The highway crosses the Efjord Bridges on its way to Ballangen and then on again to the town of Narvik.

The Efjorden area is dominated by large slopes of bare rock with a narrow green area of vegetation near the fjord. The obelisk-like mountain, Stetind, nearby is dominated by the same, dark blue-grey rock, which contrasts with the clear water in the fjord where the sand banks can be seen just below the surface. Climbers and hikers are often tempted to test their skills on the rocky slopes. The large Frostisen glacier is located in the southeastern part of the municipality.

In the east, Ballangen borders on lake Siiddašjávri which it shares with Sweden.  Siiddašjávri is the 14th largest lake which lies in or partially in Norway. Other lakes in the municipality include Børsvatnet, Geitvatnet, Hjertvatnet, Kjelvatnet, Langvatnet, Melkevatnet, Røvatnet, Søre Bukkevatnet, and Storvatnet.

The island of Barøya sits near the entrances to the Efjorden from the Ofotfjorden.  The Barøy Lighthouse sits on the northern edge of the island.

Notable people
 Anni-Frid Lyngstad, singer in the group ABBA, was born in Ballangen
 Geir Bratland, of Apoptygma Berzerk, Dimmu Borgir, God Seed, The Kovenant and Satyricon (band) was born and raised in Ballangen

Sister cities
  Tosno, Leningrad Oblast, Russia

See also
List of former municipalities of Norway

References

External links

 
Municipal fact sheet from Statistics Norway 
News article about 2021 data center deal in Ballangen
 Some nice pictures from Ballangen
 Ballangen Camping

 
Narvik
Former municipalities of Norway
1925 establishments in Norway
2020 disestablishments in Norway
Populated places disestablished in 2020